Maneater is a 2008 horror novel by the Welsh author Thomas Emson, published by Snowbooks.  It is Emson's first novel in English, following three others in Welsh.  It concerns a werewolf, Laura Greeacre whose family has waged a secret war with the Templeton family for almost 3,000 years.  The book is set in the late 1990s, and as the millennium approaches that war is brought into the open. Michael Templeton and Laura Greenacre's struggle unleashes monsters that claim many innocent lives before final victory is won.

References 

2008 novels
British horror novels
Fiction set in the 1990s